Dzierzki  is a village in the administrative district of Gmina Jedwabno, within Szczytno County, Warmian-Masurian Voivodeship, in northern Poland. 

As of 2016, the village had a population of approximately 180.

References

Dzierzki